Jenny ("Jerine") Catharine Fleurke (born 11 August 1973, in Groningen) is a retired female volleyball player from the Netherlands, who represented her native country at the 1996 Summer Olympics in Atlanta, Georgia, finishing in fifth place. 

Fleurke was a member of the Netherlands national team that won the gold medal at the 1995 European Championship by defeating Croatia 3–0 in the final.

References
  Dutch Olympic Committee

1973 births
Dutch women's volleyball players
Volleyball players at the 1996 Summer Olympics
Olympic volleyball players of the Netherlands
Sportspeople from Groningen (city)
Living people